Events from the year 1853 in art.

Events
 Georges-Eugène Haussmann is selected as prefect to begin the re-planning of Paris.

Works

 Ivan Aivazovsky
 Russian ships at the Battle of Sinop
 The Battle of Sinop, 18th November 1853 (Night after the battle)
 Thomas Jones Barker – Wellington at Sobrauren
 John Bell – A Daughter of Eve (bronze)
 Théodore Chassériau – The Tepidarium (Musée d'Orsay, Paris)
 Gustave Courbet – The Bathers (Les Baigneuses, Musée Fabre, Montpellier)
 Federico de Madrazo y Kuntz – Portrait of Amalia de Llano Countess of Vilches
 Holman Hunt – The Awakening Conscience
 Jean-Auguste-Dominique Ingres
 The Apotheosis of Napoleon I (destroyed by fire in 1871)
 Princesse Albert de Broglie
 Charles-Auguste Lebourg – Negro child playing with a lizard (Enfant nègre jouant avec un lézard, bronze)
 John Martin – completion of the triptych The Last Judgement, The Great Day of His Wrath and The Plains of Heaven
 John Everett Millais
 The Order of Release
 The Proscribed Royalist, 1651
 Gustave Moreau – The Death of Darius
 Christian Friedrich Tieck – Nicolaus Copernicus Monument in Toruń (posthumous casting)
 Franz Xaver Winterhalter – Florinda
 Albert Wolff – sculptures in Berlin
 Athena Leads the Young Warrior into the Fight
 Athena Teaches the Young Man How to Use a Weapon

Births
 February 26 – Nils Bergslien, Norwegian illustrator, painter and sculptor (died 1928)
 March 14 – Ferdinand Hodler, Swiss painter (died 1918)
 March 30
 Frank O'Meara, Irish painter (died 1888)
 Vincent van Gogh, Dutch painter (suicide 1890)
 May 13 – Adolf Hölzel, German artist/painter in an Impressionist to expressive modernism style (died 1934)
 May 28 – Carl Larsson, painter and illustrator (died 1919)
 September 5 – Giuseppe Barison, Italian painter (died 1931) 
 October 30 – Louise Abbéma, French Impressionist painter, sculptor and designer (died 1927)
 December 9 – Laurits Tuxen, Danish painter and sculptor (died 1927)

Deaths
 February 6 – August Kopisch, German poet and painter (born 1799)
 March 27 – Johann Adam Ackermann, German landscape painter (born 1780)
 April 8 – Jan Willem Pieneman, Dutch historical painter (born 1779)
 June 12 – Merry-Joseph Blondel, French neo-classic painter (born 1781)
 July 15 – Wilhelm von Kobell, German painter, printmaker and teacher (born 1766)
 July 22 – Christoffer Wilhelm Eckersberg, Danish painter (born 1783)
 November 28 – Hans Bendel, Swiss painter (born 1814)
 December 28 – Sarah Goodridge, American painter who specialized in miniatures (born 1788)
 date unknown
 Maria Johanna Görtz – Swedish still life artist (born 1783)
 Paweł Maliński, Czech-born sculptor and mason who lived and worked in Poland (born 1790)
 Tang Yifen, Chinese landscape painter and calligrapher during the Qing dynasty (born c.1778)

References 

 
Years of the 19th century in art
1850s in art